"When You Come Back to Me" is a song by Polish singer Edyta Górniak, released as the first single from her second album, Edyta (1997). It reached number three on MTV Asia, and was a top 30 hit in Sweden, while peaking within the top 40 in Belgium. The song was written by Christopher Paul Pelcer, Nicol Smith and Robert White Johnson and produced by Christopher Neil. The maxi single includes "Coming Back To Love", which was initially released as a bonus track on Japanese edition of the album.

Music video

The accompanying music video for "When You Come Back to Me" was shot in the Queen's House of the National Maritime Museum in Greenwich, London by British director Tim MacMillan. It made its world premiere on 6 October 1997 on Polish TV. The video includes scenes of Edyta Górniak in the Great Hall of the Queen's House and Edyta re-enacting the role of Audrey Hepburn in the movie Breakfast at Tiffany's. There are two versions of the music video.

Track listing
 CD single
 When You Come Back to Me (4:06)
 I Don't Know What's On Your Mind (4:00)

 CD maxi
 When You Come Back to Me (4:06)
 I Don't Know What's On Your Mind (4:00)
 Coming Back to Love (4:08) (Non-album track)

Charts

References

1997 singles
1998 singles
1990s ballads
Pop ballads
Song recordings produced by Christopher Neil
1997 songs
EMI Records singles